George Merchant (13 May 1926 – 16 August 2015) was a Scottish footballer, who played for Dundee and Falkirk. Merchant scored one of the goals as Falkirk won the 1957 Scottish Cup Final.
After retiring as a football player, he became a football coach at Dunfermline Athletic and set up a printing business.

On 16 August 2015, Merchant died in a nursing home in Carnoustie.

References

1926 births
2015 deaths
Scottish footballers
Footballers from Dundee
Aberdeen F.C. players
Dundee F.C. players
Falkirk F.C. players
Scottish Football League players
Association football forwards
Third Lanark A.C. players
Dunfermline Athletic F.C. non-playing staff